Kazimieras Steponas Šaulys (1872 – May 9, 1964) was a Lithuanian Roman Catholic priest, theologian, and one of the twenty signatories to the Act of Independence of Lithuania.

He graduated from the Theological Seminary in Kaunas in 1895 and went on to receive a master's degree from the Roman Catholic Theological Seminary in St. Petersburg in 1899. Šaulys was then appointed curate at Saint Peter and Saint Paul parish in Panevėžys. He was involved in a number of political, charitable, and educational institutions; in 1917 he participated in the Vilnius Conference, and signed the Act of Independence of Lithuania in 1918.

Šaulys specialized in canon law and moral theology, serving as a professor in these subjects at the Kaunas Theological Seminary from 1922 to 1941. He published a number of articles on religious jurisprudence, including those sections of the Provisional Constitution that dealt with religion.

After the Soviet invasion of Lithuania in 1944, he moved to Lugano, Switzerland, where he died twenty years later.

References

" Šaulys, Kazimieras". Encyclopedia Lituanica V: 79-80. (1970-1978). Ed. Simas Sužiedėlis. Boston, Massachusetts: Juozas Kapočius. LCCN 74-114275.

1872 births
1964 deaths
People from Šilutė District Municipality
People from Kovno Governorate
19th-century Lithuanian Roman Catholic priests
20th-century Lithuanian Roman Catholic priests
Members of the Council of Lithuania
Lithuanian independence activists